Disney Junior was an Australian pay television channel. It is owned and operated by The Walt Disney Company in Australia and was the sister network of the flagship property Disney Channel. The channel was originally launched 2005 as Playhouse Disney, with programming targeted towards children aged 2 to 7, as well as their families, with original series and movies. The channel was relaunched as Disney Junior on 29 May 2011.

The channel's programming is composed of original animated series television series sourced from Disney Junior in the United States, as well as screenings of Disney's theatrical releases and other acquired programming.

After indications that Disney Channel and Disney Junior would close in early 2020 due to the launch of Disney+ and expiring contracts, Foxtel advised that negotiations with Disney were continuing to keep broadcasting the networks. However, Sky confirmed that both channels would close in New Zealand from 30 November 2019. Foxtel confirmed that the channels would be leaving their service at the end of February 2020, and on Fetch TV on 30 April.

Programming
Disney Junior's programming schedule mainly consisted of animated series for children, sourced from Disney Junior in the United States. Titles airing in the 2010s have included Mickey Mouse Clubhouse and Jake and the Never Land Pirates.

Disney Junior's schedule also included internationally produced series acquired by Disney Channel Worldwide, including PJ Masks, Claude, Gigantosaurus, 101 Dalmatian Street and Go Away, Unicorn!.

The channel aired event screenings of Disney's theatrical releases, including Mickey's Once Upon a Christmas.

Disney Junior Australia had also commissioned and produced original local series, including The Book of Once Upon a Time, which featured Australian voices reading classic and contemporary Disney stories. The network also debuted Alphabet Street in 2019.

References

External links
 Disney Junior Australia

Television channels in New Zealand
Children's television channels in Australia
English-language television stations in Australia
English-language television stations in New Zealand
Television channels and stations established in 2005
Television channels and stations disestablished in 2020
Commercial-free television networks in Australia
Australia and New Zealand
2005 establishments in Australia
2020 disestablishments in Australia
Defunct television channels in Australia